Natasha Alexandra Rastapkavičius Arrondo (born 25 June 1975), professionally known as Natasha Klauss, is a Colombian actress and  businesswoman of Uruguayan and Lithuanian descent, best known for her roles in Telemundo telenovelas La Venganza, Pasión de Gavilanes, El Zorro, la espada y la rosa and La Tormenta.

Early life 
Natasha Klauss was born in Cali, Colombia and raised in Barranquilla, Atlántico, Colombia to a Uruguayan father of Lithuanian–Russian descent and a Uruguayan mother. She has an older sister, Tatiana. Klauss originally aspired to be a ballerina dancer after taking lessons, dreaming of performing in the Bolshoi Theatre. One year before her graduation, however, she injured her knee in a car accident, ending her career in dance. Natasha then decided to study acting instead of dancing.

Career 
Klauss began her acting career in television series and plays, portraying small roles mostly. In 2002 Klauss portrayed a lesbian Sandra Guzmán in the Telemundo telenovela La Venganza, co–starring Gabriela Španić and Catherine Siachoque; she won prestigious awards such as Premios Mara de Venezuela and TVyNovelas Award for Best Supporting Actress for her portrayal. Klauss then starred alongside Michel Brown, Danna García, Paola Rey, Mario Cimarro and Juan Alfonso Baptista in hit telenovela Pasión de Gavilanes, which brought her numerous awards — including ACE Award for Best Supporting Actress. In 2004 she once again starred with Paola Rey and Juan Alfonso Baptista in telenovela La Mujer en el Espejo.

In 2005 Klass won a Premio TVyNovelas for Best Antagonist for her role in La Tormenta, with Natalia Streignard and Christian Meier, and began acting in 2005–07 series Decisiones. She appeared in 2007 telenovela Zorro: La Espada y la Rosa, starring Christian Meier and Marlene Favela, and produced by Telemundo and RTI. The following year Klauss appeared in series Novia para Dos.

Personal life 
In 2000, Klauss married the television producer, Víctor Gómez. In April 2000, she gave birth to the couple's first child, a girl, whom they called Isabel Gómez Rastapkevicius. The couple divorced in 2001. In 2003, she married her first cousin, Marcelo Greco. In April 2009, she gave birth to her second child and first child with Greco, whom they called Paloma Greco. They divorced in 2012. Since 2020, Klauss is in a relationship with Daniel Gómez. On 28 December 2020, Klauss announced on her Instagram account that she and Gómez are engaged.They got married on 17 June 2022.

Filmography

Television

Awards and nominations

References

External links 
 
 Nataska Klauss at the Telemundo's official website
 
 Natasha Klauss at MySpace

1975 births
Colombian television actresses
Colombian telenovela actresses
Colombian people of Uruguayan descent
Colombian people of Lithuanian descent
Colombian people of Russian descent
Living people
People from Barranquilla